USS Grunion (SS-216) was a Gato-class submarine that sank at Kiska, Alaska, during World War II. She was the only ship of the United States Navy to be named for the grunion.

Construction and commissioning
Grunion′s keel was laid down by the Electric Boat Company in Groton, Connecticut, on 1 March 1941. She was launched on 22 December 1941, (sponsored by Mrs. Stanford C. Hooper, wife of Rear Admiral Hooper), and commissioned on 11 April 1942 with Lieutenant Commander Mannert L. Abele, USNA class of 1926 in command.

Service history
After shakedown from New London, Connecticut, Grunion sailed for the Pacific on 24 May. A week later, as she transited the Caribbean Sea for Panama, she rescued 16 survivors of the USAT Jack, which had been torpedoed by the German U-boat , and conducted a fruitless search for 13 other survivors presumed to be in the vicinity. Arriving at Coco Solo on 3 June, Grunion landed the survivors and continued on to Pearl Harbor, arriving on 20 June.

Departing Hawaii on 30 June after ten days of intensive training, Grunion touched Midway Atoll in the Northwestern Hawaiian Islands before heading toward the Aleutian Islands for her first war patrol. Her first report, made as she patrolled north of Kiska Island, stated she had been attacked by a Japanese destroyer and had fired Mark 14 torpedoes at her with inconclusive results. She operated off Kiska throughout July and sank two Japanese sub-chasers (CH-25 and CH-27) and possibly damaged a third (CH-26) as she waited for enemy shipping. On 30 July, the submarine reported intensive antisubmarine activity and was ordered back to Dutch Harbor.

Grunion was never heard from again. Air searches off Kiska were fruitless, and on 5 October Grunion was reported overdue from patrol and assumed lost with all hands. Her name was stricken from the Naval Vessel Register on 2 November 1942. Captured Japanese records show no antisubmarine attacks in the Kiska area, and the fate of Grunion remained a mystery for 65 years, until the discovery in the Bering Sea in August 2007 of a wreck believed to be her. In October 2008, the U.S. Navy verified that the wreck is Grunion.

Honors and awards
  Asiatic-Pacific Campaign Medal with one battle star for World War II service.

Finding Grunion 
In 1998 Lieutenant Colonel Richard Lane purchased for $1 a wiring diagram from a Japanese cargo ship, Kano Maru, which had been active during World War II. Hoping to authenticate the document, Lane posted it on a Japanese naval historical website, asking if anyone could help. He was contacted by Yutaka Iwasaki, a Japanese naval historian, who not only authenticated it, but suggested he knew what happened to Grunion. Lane contacted ComSubPac, and their public affairs officer, Darrel Ames, posted the information on ComSubPac's Grunion Web site.

When Grunion disappeared in 1942, her captain, Lieutenant Commander Abele, left behind three sons — Bruce, Brad, and John. For nearly 65 years, they had been searching for information about the loss of their father's boat.

When the Abele brothers encountered the post, they contacted Yutaka Iwasaki. He sent them a translation of an article written by the officer who had commanded the merchant ship Kano Maru. The article described an encounter with a submarine near Kiska Island in the Aleutians about the time Grunion was reported missing.

Several years later, John Abele, cofounder of Boston Scientific, met Dr. Robert Ballard, famous for discovering the wreck of the RMS Titanic. Ballard gave him advice on how to locate a shipwreck, and Abele decided to fund an expedition to find the lost submarine Grunion.

In 2006, Williamson Associates, using side-scan sonar, located a promising target almost at the exact location indicated by the commander of Kano Maru. The sunken object had many characteristics typical of a submarine. In 2007, using a remotely operated underwater vehicle (ROV), DSSI/Oceaneering, returned to the site and took video recordings of the imploded remains of a submarine, which had markings in English, and propeller guards and limber holes identical to those of Grunion. The following year, the U.S. Navy confirmed that the find was Grunion.

Although it is not absolutely certain, the evidence strongly suggests that Grunion was lost as a result of multiple torpedo failures during her encounter with Kano Maru. Her first torpedo ran low, but despite its magnetic pistol it failed to detonate. Two more bounced harmlessly off Kano Maru without exploding. However, the remaining torpedo missed its target and circled back, striking the periscope supports on the submerged submarine without exploding. The damage the torpedo inflicted, combined with a jammed rear dive plane, triggered a sequence of events that caused the loss of depth control. Grunion lunged below her maximum operational depth, and at about  would have imploded. The wreckage then slid  down the side of an extinct volcano, coming to rest on a notch in the underwater mountain.

References

External links

 navsource.org: USS Grunion
 hazegray.org: USS Grunion
On Eternal Patrol: USS Grunion
The USS Grunion may have been Found — a story at NPR.org
 ABCNews.com, 3 October 2006."Object Off Alaska Coast May Be WWII Sub"  viewed 3 October 2006.
After 64 years, relatives may have answers in sub sinking viewed 5 October 2006 Defunct site prior to January 2011
Detroit sailor only one of WWII crew whose relatives can't be located The Detroit News from 24 August 2007
Wreckage of WWII submarine found off Aleutian Islands dated 24 August 2007

1941 ships
1942 in Alaska
2007 in Alaska
Gato-class submarines
Lost submarines of the United States
Ships built in Groton, Connecticut
Ships of the Aleutian Islands campaign
Shipwrecks of the Alaska coast
World War II submarines of the United States
Shipwrecks in the Bering Sea
Ships lost with all hands
Maritime incidents in July 1942